Iridomyrmex fulgens is a species of ant in the genus Iridomyrmex. Described by Heterick and Shattukck in 2011, the species is found in several states in Australia, usually in the drier regions of the country.

Etymology
The species name derives from the Latin language, and when translated, it means 'brilliant' or 'splendid', which refers to parts of the ants body, or in particular its brown foreparts presenting a shiny appearance.

References

Iridomyrmex
Hymenoptera of Australia
Insects described in 2011